Plant Heritage, formerly known as the National Council for the Conservation of Plants and Gardens (NCCPG), is a botanical conservation organisation in the United Kingdom and a registered charity. It was founded in 1978 to combine the talents of botanists, horticulturalists and conservationists with the dedication of keen amateur and professional gardeners. The mission statement of the organisation declares that "The NCCPG seeks to conserve, document, promote and make available Britain and Ireland's rich biodiversity of garden plants for the benefit of everyone through horticulture, education and science." Specifically, the aims of the organisation are to:

 encourage the propagation and conservation of endangered garden plants in the British Isles, both species and cultivars; 
 encourage and conduct research into cultivated plants, their origins, their historical and cultural importance and their environments; and
 encourage the education of the public in garden plant conservation.

Through its membership and the National Plant Collection holders, Plant Heritage seeks to rediscover and reintroduce endangered garden plants by encouraging their propagation and distribution so that they are grown as widely as possible. The charity works closely with other conservation bodies as well as botanic gardens, the National Trust, the National Trust for Scotland, English Heritage, the Royal Horticultural Society and many specialist horticultural societies.

Plant Heritage's patron is The Prince of Wales.

In 2010, the television gardener Alan Titchmarsh became president of the charity.

See also
 Heirloom plant
 List of botanical gardens in the United Kingdom
 Plant Collections Network

References

External links

Botanical societies
British biology societies
Environmental charities based in the United Kingdom
Plant conservation
1978 establishments in the United Kingdom
Organizations established in 1978
Nature conservation organisations based in the United Kingdom
Gardens in the United Kingdom